The Olympia Condos, a 33-storey (98 metres) condo building is the 4th tallest building in Hamilton, Ontario, Canada. Situated just east of John Street South on Charlton Avenue East in the Corktown neighbourhood, 2 blocks east of the St. Joseph's hospital and nearby is the mountain access known as Arkledun Avenue/Jolley Cut. It is also a 5-minute walk to the downtown Hamilton GO Transit station from this location.

The building features an indoor pool, squash courts, a fitness room and sauna. Every apartment has a balcony. On a clear day from the top floor balconies the Toronto skyline can be seen across Lake Ontario.

See also
List of tallest buildings in Hamilton, Ontario

Images

References

External links

Hamilton Skyscraper page- diagrams
Image #1: Olympia Apartments
Image #2: Olympia Apartments

Buildings and structures in Hamilton, Ontario
Apartment buildings in Canada
Residential buildings completed in 1976